Rami Serry (born 28 February 1980) is an Egyptian racing driver.

Background
Rami Serry has been racing since the age of 17. Since then he has been winning championships back to back in Egypt and the Middle East. He is considered to be a well rounded driver who is at the forefront in Single Seater racing (Formula) Gymkhana, Rallying, Circuit Racing, and most importantly – Drifting!

"Rami is an outstanding driver! He is very capable of doing well professionally in Formula Drift. His ability to adapt is very impressive! Especially that it was his first time tandem drifting in the US and he was the first drifter in the middle east to approach the formula drift license series and got 4th position  ” (Forrest Wang - Formula Drift Pro Driver)

Personality
Many consider Serry a relentless, driven fighter, who overcomes any challenges that are thrown his way. He is viewed as a champion at heart, and races for the people. Serry is considered to be a hero to hundreds of thousands of young Egyptians across the World. Besides being the Race Car Driver Household name of Egypt, many take him as an example for achieving goals, persistence, hard work, and relentless determination towards reaching dreams. He is the "Voice" of the Egyptian Motorsport Industry.

Early years
Serry was born in Cairo. From a very young age, he showed signs of extraordinary driving skills and quickly gained respect in the world of motor sport. After studying in the United States in 1998 he returned to Egypt in 2001 to pursue his goal of becoming the Egyptian Autocross champion. With limited choices in racing events around the country, Serry stuck to the Egyptian Autocross and quickly impressed the audience with his extreme driving style, which gained him many fans and admirers around the country.

False Accusations
However, his fame turned against him in 2005 when an illegal street race took place on the main airport road in Cairo. One of the drivers lost control of his car and crashed into the crowd, injuring 12 and killing 6. The next day Serry was arrested at his home in Heliopolis as a suspect in the lethal accident, his name having been given to the police by a few witnesses who alleged that he was driving the silver BMW involved. Serry was charged with racing in the illegal race and when it was proven that he had not done so, was then charged with organizing it.

After spending 34 days in prison, Serry was able to prove his innocence and was interviewed on the TV show Al-Qahira Al-Youm with Amr Adib. He received direct apologies from many high-ranking officials around the country for being falsely accused. Serry's fame rocketed after his vindication and he became a household name around the country.

Later career
After his release Serry was determined to build a race track in Egypt to prevent similar accidents. After many unsuccessful attempts to achieve this, he concluded that the country was not yet ready for motorsport, and moved to Bahrain, considered to be the home of motorsport in the Middle East, where he became Managing Editor of Arabia Motors, a popular motoring magazine in the Persian Gulf region. For two years Serry worked and raced in Bahrain, gaining valuable experience. He participated for a full season in Formula BMW at the Bahrain International Circuit  and also in drift challenges around the Persian Gulf, extending his fame to other areas of the Middle East. Serry then moved back to Egypt to start his own magazine  and TV show. Since his arrival he has ventured out into numerous pursuits which included experiments in BioGeometry  with Dr. Ibrahim Karim. They both teamed up to introduce the technology to both the automobile and motorsport industries. After promising results, Serry was offered a chance to speak about his experiences and the new technology at the TEDx event which took place at the American University in Cairo under the name of TEDxCairo. Rami held a senior marketing position at LINKdotNET in 2010 and is currently the Marketing Manager at Nestle Nespresso.

Recent Motorsport Achievements
Serry made history in 2011 by being the first Egyptian to win Red Bull Car Park Drift  in Egypt. He continued to dominate the drifting scene by also winning the 2012 Red Bull CPD Egypt Qualifier as well as placing 2nd in the Middle East Finals in Jordan. This was despite having his car impounded by the Egyptian authorities at the borders of Egypt and Jordan in Nuweiba' a day before the race. Serry has continued to place podium positions in every Red Bull Car Park Drift event since.

Rami once again made worldwide headlines by building the first BMW 1M V8 in the world. This one of a kind car helped Serry achieve his second consecutive win of Red Bull Car Park Drift.

In September 2014, Serry once again made history by being the first Egyptian, Arab, and African to compete in a Licensing Series for Formula Drift USA.

Serry is currently the only Egyptian and Arab to be licensed to race in Formula Drift. He is the first Egyptian that will ever compete professionally in an international drifting series.

Sponsors and Partners
Besides being Egypt's notorious race car driver with unmatched following & popularity, Rami Serry is considered to be the business mastermind and marketing heart of the motorsport industry in Egypt. Throughout the years, he managed to secure sponsorship deals with the world's largest corporations, who in turn supported him in clenching some of the most important racing titles in Egypt's motorsport history. Below is a list of Serry's past and current sponsors and partners:

- Liqui Moly
- dubizzle.com
- Castrol
- LinkDSL
- Bridgestone
- Valvoline
- Total
- MSN Arabia
- Vodafone
- Champion
- Sensodyne
- Meguin

Motorsport Victories
4th Place winner in Vegas Drift Licensing Series (USA) -
2nd Place winner in Formula 	BMW (BIC - Bahrain) -
1st Place winner in Red Bull 	Car Park Drift 2011 -
1st Place winner in Red Bull 	Car Park Drift 2012 -
2nd Place winner in RBCPD 	Middle East Finals 2012 -
3rd Place winner in Red Bull 	Car Park Drift 2013 -
3rd Place winner in Red Bull 	Car Park Drift 2014 -
2nd Place winner in the World 	Drifter Awards -
2nd overall winner in Egypt 	Autocross 2011 -
2nd overall winner in Egypt 	Autocross 2003 -
2nd overall winner in Egypt 	Autocross 2004 -
1st Place winner in Rear Wheel Category Egypt Autocross (2000, 2001, 2002, 2003, 2004, 2005, 2006, 2009)

References

Drifting drivers
Egyptian racing drivers
1980 births
Sportspeople from Cairo
Living people